Wawona (formerly Big Tree Station, Clark's Station, Clarks Station, Wah-wo-nah, and Clark's Ranch) is a census-designated place in Mariposa County, California, United States. The population was 111 at the 2020 census. 

It is located entirely within Yosemite National Park, as it preceded the founding of the park as a national recreation area. The number of inhabitants increases dramatically during peak tourist seasons, due to the large number of rental cabins in the town.

The ZIP Code is 95389. The community is inside area code 209.

History
It was known to the local Native American Miwok in their language as Pallachun ("a good place to stay"). The origin of the word Wawona is not known. A popular story claims Wawō'na was the Miwok word for "big tree", or for "hoot of the owl", a bird considered the sequoia trees' spiritual guardian.

Galen Clark, who helped gain preservation legislation for Mariposa Grove and what became Yosemite National Park, occupied this area in 1855. He established a tourist rest and modest ranch in 1856. Clark sold the property to the Washburn brothers in 1874, who built a larger hotel in 1876, adding to it later. Hotel keeper Jean Bruce Washburn named the resort property Wawona in 1883.

Wawona is the location of the historic Wawona Hotel, built by Washburn in 1876, with additional structures added into the early 20th century. A classic Victorian resort, it was designated a National Historic Landmark in 1987.

The Clark's Station US Post Office opened in 1878.  In 1883 its name was changed to Wawona.

Geography
It is on State Route 41, the main highway from Fresno to Yosemite Valley. It is the town nearest to Chilnualna Falls and the Mariposa Grove of Giant Sequoia. The principal trailheads into the southern Yosemite wilderness are located in Wawona.

Demographics
The 2010 United States Census reported that Wawona had a population of 169. The racial makeup of Wawona was 138 (81.7%) White, 2 (1.2%) African American, 3 (1.8%) Native American, 4 (2.4%) Asian, 0 (0.0%) Pacific Islander, 8 (4.7%) from other races, and 14 (8.3%) from two or more races. Hispanic or Latino of any race were 12 persons (7.1%).

The Census reported that 163 people (96.4% of the population) lived in households, 6 (3.6%) lived in non-institutionalized group quarters, and 0 (0%) were institutionalized.

There were 71 households, out of which 16 (22.5%) had children under the age of 18 living in them, 29 (40.8%) were opposite-sex married couples living together, 3 (4.2%) had a female householder with no husband present, 4 (5.6%) had a male householder with no wife present.  There were 4 (5.6%) unmarried opposite-sex partnerships, and 2 (2.8%) same-sex married couples or partnerships. 26 households (36.6%) were made up of individuals, and 2 (2.8%) had someone living alone who was 65 years of age or older. The average household size was 2.30.  There were 36 families (50.7% of all households); the average family size was 2.94.

The population was spread out, with 32 people (18.9%) under the age of 18, 10 people (5.9%) aged 18 to 24, 46 people (27.2%) aged 25 to 44, 66 people (39.1%) aged 45 to 64, and 15 people (8.9%) who were 65 years of age or older.  The median age was 43.6 years. For every 100 females, there were 141.4 males.  For every 100 females age 18 and over, there were 149.1 males.

The homeowner vacancy rate was 4.3%; the rental vacancy rate was 2.0%.  45 people (26.6% of the population) lived in owner-occupied housing units and 118 people (69.8%) lived in rental housing units.

Government

Attractions
 Camp Wawona
 Chilnualna Falls
 Wawona Campground
 Wawona Golf Course
 Wawona Hotel
 Wawona Stables
 Wawona Tunnel Tree
 Yosemite Pioneer History Center

References

External links
 Wawona History, the Washburns, their old hotel and the US Army

Census-designated places in Mariposa County, California
Yosemite National Park
Populated places in the Sierra Nevada (United States)
Populated places established in 1856
1856 establishments in California
Census-designated places in California